Eruera Riini Manuera  (6 January 1895 – 15 June 1990) was a New Zealand tribal leader, labourer and farmer. Of Māori descent, he identified with the Ngati Awa iwi. He was born in Te Waea, Bay of Plenty, New Zealand, on 6 January 1895.

In the 1974 New Year Honours, Manuera was appointed a Member of the Order of the British Empire, for services to the Māori people. He was promoted to Officer of the Order of the British Empire, also for services to the Māori people, in the 1977 New Year Honours.

References

1895 births
1990 deaths
New Zealand farmers
New Zealand Māori farmers
Ngāti Awa people
New Zealand Officers of the Order of the British Empire